St. Michael Catholic Secondary School, known simply as St. Mikes, is a Catholic secondary school located in Stratford, Ontario. It is one of three high schools in the Stratford area, and one of only two secondary schools in the Huron-Perth Catholic District School Board. Approximately 900 students attend on an annual basis.

Athletics 
St. Mikes is well known for its athletic programs. The school continually sends teams to OFSAA, many of which have been very successful. In the 2007-08 year the Senior Girls' Volleyball team captured the Ofsaa gold for the second year in a row while the Senior Boys' team won the bronze medal. Not to be outdone the Senior Boys' Nordic ski team, consisting of Scott Weersink, Brett Weersink, Ian Hartman, and Ian Weir, won an Ofsaa Gold as a team in the 10 km ski race, and a bronze in the relay event. On the girls' side, with an impressive performance Janel Sauder took OFSAA gold individually for winning the Senior Girls' race.

Every year, the students who attend St. Mikes participate in an event called "March for Mikes" where each student is asked to raise $35. The money is distributed among all the sports teams and clubs at St. Mikes to decrease the cost for each individual student to join a club.

Clubs and Extracurriculars 
As well as a strong athletics program, St. Michael also has a vibrant and diverse variety of extracurricular activities that contribute greatly to the school's overall atmosphere. With clubs ranging from the arts to social justice, there is an activity for every student. In recent years, thanks to increased funding, the school has been able to grow and support a band program that currently consists of three different bands (a senior, jazz and junior band). The bands regularly place well at MusicFest Regionals and the local Kiwanis festival that occurs at Stratford Central Secondary School. The Senior Band was invited to participate at the MusicFest Nationals in Ottawa during May 2016. They received a silver award for their performance, and a Gold for sight reading. St. Michael can expect to see improved results in the coming years as more funding is increased to elementary school programs, and the program is further developed by the strong hand of Jeff McIntyre and the dedication of the students.

Notable alumni 
 Boyd Devereaux (class of 1995) - former National Hockey League Player
 Rem Murray (class of 1991) - under contract with HIFK Helsinki of the SM-Liiga (Finland)
 Justin Bieber (class of 2012) - Singer/Songwriter

See also 
 List of high schools in Ontario

References 

Catholic secondary schools in Ontario
Educational institutions established in 1990
High schools in Stratford, Ontario
1990 establishments in Ontario